The 1997 Prix de l'Arc de Triomphe was a horse race held at Longchamp on Sunday 5 October 1997. It was the 76th running of the Prix de l'Arc de Triomphe.

The winner was Peintre Celebre, a three-year-old colt trained in France by André Fabre. The winning jockey was Olivier Peslier.

The winning time of 2m 24.6s set a new record for the race. The previous record of 2m 26.3s was achieved by Trempolino in 1987.

Race details
 Sponsor: no sponsor
 Purse: 7,000,000 F; First prize: 4,000,000 F
 Going: Good to Firm
 Distance: 2,400 metres
 Number of runners: 18
 Winner's time: 2m 24.6s (new record)

Full result

 Abbreviations: shd = short-head; snk = short-neck; nk = neck

Winner's details
Further details of the winner, Peintre Celebre.
 Sex: Colt
 Foaled: 17 March 1994
 Country: United States
 Sire: Nureyev; Dam: Peinture Bleue (Alydar)
 Owner: Daniel Wildenstein
 Breeder: Allez France Stables

References

External links
 Colour Chart – Arc 1997

Prix de l'Arc de Triomphe
 1997
Prix de l'Arc de Triomphe
Prix de l'Arc de Triomphe
Prix de l'Arc de Triomphe